Amauropsis islandica, common name the Iceland moonsnail, is a species of predatory sea snail, a marine gastropod mollusk in the family Naticidae, the moon snails.

Description
The maximum recorded shell length is 40 mm.

Habitat
Minimum recorded depth is 9 m. Maximum recorded depth is 240 m.

References

Naticidae
Gastropods described in 1791
Taxa named by Johann Friedrich Gmelin